Narpavalakudi  is a village in the Aranthangirevenue block of Pudukkottai district, Tamil Nadu, India.

Demographics 

As per the 2001 census, Narpavalakudi had a total population of 551 with 242 males and 309 females. Out of the total population 299 people were literate.

References

Villages in Pudukkottai district